Rancho Muscupiabe was a  Mexican land grant in present day San Bernardino County, California given to Michael C. White on April 29, 1843, by Governor Manuel Micheltorena. The name comes from the Serrano word muscupiabit, meaning "place of little pines." The rancho was adjacent to Cajon Pass.

History
In 1843, Michael White, also known as Miguel Blanco, was granted rights to Rancho Muscupiabe.  The land was home to a village of Serrano Indians. White was married to the daughter of Eulalia Perez, the housekeeper of the San Gabriel Mission (located about 45 miles west), and was persuaded to set up a rancho on the path used by raiding bands of nomadic indigenous people. He built a fortified home that overlooked the pass and the Mojave Trail. White left after nine months of having his cattle stolen.

On June 22, 1872, White's holdings were affirmed by the Public Land Commission.

References

California ranchos
Ranchos of San Bernardino County, California